Lyciasalamandra is a genus of salamanders in the family Salamandridae. They are native to southwestern coast of Turkey and nearby Aegean Islands (Greece). As of early 2018, all species in the genus are threatened. The common name Lycian salamanders has been coined for them.

Species
Lyciasalamandra contains seven recognized species:

Molecular data suggest that some recently described species (Lyciasalamandra irfani, Lyciasalamandra arikani, and Lyciasalamandra yehudahi), which as of early 2018 are still listed by the AmphibiaWeb, should be considered as subspecies of Lyciasalamandra billae.

Reproduction
All Lyciasalamandra species are viviparous, as are four species of Salamandra.

References 

 
Amphibian genera
Amphibians of Asia
Amphibians of Europe
Taxonomy articles created by Polbot